Reefer Madness: Sex, Drugs, and Cheap Labor in the American Black Market is a book written by Eric Schlosser and published in 2003. The book is a look at the three pillars of the underground economy of the United States, estimated by Schlosser to be ten percent of U.S. GDP: marijuana, migrant labor, and pornography.

The book is divided into three chapters:

Chapter 1: Reefer Madness, Schlosser argues, based on usage, historical context, and consequences, for the decriminalization of marijuana.

Chapter 2: In the Strawberry Fields, he explores the exploitation of illegal aliens as cheap labor, arguing that there should be better living arrangements and humane treatment of the illegal aliens the U.S. is exploiting in the fields of California.

Chapter 3: An Empire of the Obscene details the history of pornography in U.S. culture, starting with the eventual business magnate Reuben Sturman.  Schlosser closes by arguing that such a widespread black market can only undermine the law and is indicative of the discrepancy between accepted mainstream U.S. culture and its true nature.

See also
 List of books about cannabis

References

External links
 Eric Schlosser speech on The US Underground Economy - Reefer Madness 
Booknotes interview with Schlosser on Reefer Madness, June 15, 2003
Presentation by Schlosser on Reefer Madness at the Miami Book Fair, November 9, 2003

2003 non-fiction books
Non-fiction books about cannabis
Non-fiction books about pornography
Non-fiction books about immigration to the United States
Works about magazine publishing
Works about the informal economy
Books by Eric Schlosser
American books about cannabis